SOTM may refer to:

Entertainment
 Secrets of the Moon, a black metal band from Osnabrück, Germany.
 Sentinels of the Multiverse, a cooperative card game.
 Sentinels of the Multiverse: The Video Game, a video game based on the previous card game.
 "SOTM", a 2014 song by Teebs off the album Estara

Transportation
 Satcom On The Move (SotM), a vehicle capable of maintaining a satellite communication while moving
 Solosche Tramweg Maatschappij (SoTM), a rail company; see List of railway companies in the Dutch East Indies

Other uses
 State of the Map, a kind of regular event organised by OpenStreetMap contributors around the world.
 State of the Municipality address, a version of the State of the City address, a speech by the mayor or city manager about the condition of the municipality

See also

 
 STM (disambiguation)
 som (disambiguation)
 SM (disambiguation)